Jim or JIM may refer to:

 Jim (given name), a given name
 Jim, a diminutive form of the given name James
 Jim, a short form of the given name Jimmy
 OPCW-UN Joint Investigative Mechanism
 Jim (comics), a series by Jim Woodring
 Jim (album), by soul artist Jamie Lidell
 Jim (Huckleberry Finn), a character in Mark Twain's novel 
 Jim (TV channel), in Finland
 JIM (Flemish TV channel)
 JIM suit, for atmospheric diving
 Jim River, in North and South Dakota, United States
 Jim, the nickname of Yelkanum Seclamatan (died April 1911), Native American chief
 Journal of Internal Medicine
 Juan Ignacio Martínez (born 1964), Spanish footballer, commonly known as JIM
 Jim (horse), milk wagon horse used to produce serum containing diphtheria antitoxin
 "Jim" (song), a 1941 song.
 JIM, Jiangxi Isuzu Motors, a joint venture between Isuzu and Jiangling Motors Corporation Group (JMCG).
  Jim (Medal of Honor recipient)

See also 
 
 Gym
 Jjim
 Ǧīm
 James (disambiguation)
 Jimbo (disambiguation)
 Jimmy (disambiguation)
JYM